Maloye Pankino is a rural locality (a village) in Yurochenskoye Rural Settlement, Sheksninsky District, Vologda Oblast, Russia. The population was 3 as of 2002.

Geography 
Maloye Pankino is located 17 km south of Sheksna (the district's administrative centre) by road. Boshoye Pankino is the nearest rural locality.

References 

Rural localities in Sheksninsky District